Damjan Jakimovski (born November 14, 1995) is a Macedonian professional basketball point guard for Karpoš Sokoli in the Macedonian First League.

External links
 aba-liga Profile
 FIBA Profile
 RealGM Profile
 BGbasket Profile
 Eurobasket Profile

References

1995 births
Living people
ABA League players
Macedonian men's basketball players
Sportspeople from Skopje
Point guards